George Young Newbern (born December 30, 1964) is an American actor, best known for his roles as Charlie in the ABC show Scandal and Bryan MacKenzie in Father of the Bride (1991) and its sequels Father of the Bride Part II and Father of the Bride Part 3 (ish), as well as Danny (The Yeti) in Friends and his recurring role as Julia's son Payne in Designing Women. He is also known for providing the voice of Superman in many pieces of DC Comics media, and Sephiroth in the Final Fantasy series and the Kingdom Hearts series.

Early life
Born in Little Rock, Arkansas, Newbern is the son of Betty, a Spanish teacher and David Newbern, a radiologist. George has two brothers (Gordon and John) and one sister (Murry).

Career

Film and television
He began his acting career at the Arkansas Arts Center in Little Rock, in the role of the younger brother in Life with Father, based on Clarence S. Day Jr.'s autobiographical novels. This first acting role spurred him on to other acting roles and eventually on to movie roles. Newbern's first lead role was in 1987's Double Switch, a retelling of The Prince and the Pauper that aired as a part of the Wonderful World of Disney television series. 

From 1986 to 1992, Newbern had a recurring role as Payne McIlroy, the son of designer Julia Sugarbaker (played by Dixie Carter), on the series Designing Women. He has since guest-starred on television in such series as Providence, Chicago Hope, Friends, Bull, CSI, Medium, Ghost Whisperer, Touched by an Angel, Criminal Minds, and Private Practice. He had a recurring role for several seasons as a former CIA operative in Scandal.

He starred as Neal Morris, father of Melissa Morris (Emily Osment), in the 2009 Disney Channel movie Dadnapped, and portrayed Apollo 14 astronaut Stu Roosa in the HBO mini-series From The Earth To The Moon. Film credits include Adventures in Babysitting (1987) with Elisabeth Shue; Double Switch (1987); Switching Channels (1988) with Kathleen Turner, Burt Reynolds and Christopher Reeve; and Father of the Bride (1991) and its sequel Father of the Bride Part II. In 2009 he appeared in Locker 13.

Voice acting
As a voice actor, Newbern is notable for his role as Clark Kent/Superman on the Cartoon Network series Justice League, Static Shock and Justice League Unlimited (as a replacement for Tim Daly due to his contractual obligations elsewhere). He also reprised his role as Superman in The Batman fifth season two-part opener "The Batman/Superman Story" and the series finale episode "Lost Heroes" even though that series was described as existing in a different continuity. He reprised his role as Superman in the DC Showcase short Superman/Shazam!: The Return of Black Adam and as well as Superman vs. The Elite. On February 26, 2016, the DC Universe Online Facebook page reported that Newbern would be taking over the role of Superman from Adam Baldwin. He also provides the voice of Superman in the game Injustice: Gods Among Us and its sequel.

Newbern also lent his voice in the cartoon series The Pirates of Dark Water, and he has also done voiceovers on a number of video games and game-related productions. He has also voiced in the infamous Theodore Rex as the character of the same name. In 2003, Newbern provided the voice of Mevyn Nooj in Final Fantasy X-2.

His performance as Nooj reportedly impressed the developers at Square Enix enough for them to cast him as Sephiroth in the English version of Kingdom Hearts II (replacing Lance Bass) and he would also go on to reprise the role in the English-language releases of Final Fantasy VII Advent Children, Crisis Core: Final Fantasy VII, Dissidia: Final Fantasy, Dissidia 012 Final Fantasy and Dissidia Final Fantasy NT. He later appeared in the second season of Jericho as the President of the Allied States of America. Newbern also narrated Toyota's commercials for the 2010 model year of the Prius, one of the car company's younger automotive models, and portrayed Harold in Saw VI.

Personal life
Newbern met actress Marietta DePrima in the mid-1980s. They graduated together at  Northwestern University, where she was a member of Kappa Alpha Theta. The couple married in 1990, and they now have three children.

Filmography

Film

Television

Video games

References

External links
 
 Voice chasers 
 Interview with George Newbern on Voiceover Role in Superman vs  the Elite

1964 births
Living people
American male film actors
American male television actors
American male voice actors
American male video game actors
Little Rock Central High School alumni
Male actors from Little Rock, Arkansas
20th-century American male actors
21st-century American male actors